Lakhta railway station is a railway station in Saint Petersburg, Russia. It was named after the historical district of Lakhta-Olgino Municipal Okrug.

The station was built by JSC Prinorskaya St. Peterburg–Sestroretsk railway and it was opened on 12 July 1894 as part of the opening section between Uzlovaya and Lakhta. It was considered as a terminal until on 31 October 1894, the line was lengthened to Razdelnaya, what is now Lisy Nos railway station.

References 

Railway stations opened in 1894